Girdharnagar is an area located in Ahmedabad, India.

Neighbourhoods in Ahmedabad